Eternal Call may refer to:

Eternal Call, a novel by Anatoli Ivanov
Eternal Call, a Soviet 1973—1983 epic TV series based on Ivanov's novel
Eternal Call, a track from the Metal Massacre XI album